Montana's BBQ & Bar (originally and in some cases, still branded as Montana's Cookhouse Saloon) is a Canadian restaurant chain known for smoked pork ribs, steaks, and burgers. It is headquartered in Vaughan, Ontario and is a subsidiary of Recipe Unlimited.

Operations
Montana's BBQ & Bar has 105 restaurants located in all the Canadian provinces except Quebec, and none in the three territories. As of February 2009, Montana's closed their United States locations in Michigan and New York.

History
Montana's Cookhouse first opened its doors in 1995 as a subsidiary of Kelseys Original Roadhouse. The original idea was thought up by Kelsey's owner Paul Jeffery and its president Nils Kravis. In 1999, Cara Operations (now known as Recipe Unlimited) obtained controlling interest in Kelsey's, including the Montana's chain. Cara completed its acquisition of the entire company 2002.

, the chain began rebranding as Montana's BBQ & Bar.

Loyalty program

Montana's began a partnership with Scene in February 2015.

See also
List of Canadian restaurant chains
List of assets owned by Recipe Unlimited

References

External links

Recipe Unlimited
Restaurant chains in Canada
Restaurants established in 1995
Steakhouses
Theme restaurants
Defunct restaurant chains in the United States